The smalleye catshark (Apristurus microps) is a catshark of the family Scyliorhinidae, found in the southeast Atlantic at depths between 700 and 2,000 m. It can grow up to 61 cm. The reproduction of this catshark is oviparous.

References

 

smalleye catshark
Marine fish of South Africa
Marine fauna of Southern Africa
Taxa named by John Dow Fisher Gilchrist
smalleye catshark